Lost in a Dream may refer to:

 Lost in a Dream (REO Speedwagon album)
 Lost in a Dream (Paul Motian album)